Tamuda is a rural locality (a selo) in Mazadinsky Selsoviet, Tlyaratinsky District, Republic of Dagestan, Russia. The population was 67 as of 2010.

Geography 
Tamuda is located 23 km north of Tlyarata (the district's administrative centre) by road. Khobokh is the nearest rural locality.

References 

Rural localities in Tlyaratinsky District